Patrick O'Connor may refer to:

 Patrick O'Connor (sprinter) (born 1966), Jamaican sprinter
 Patrick O'Connor (hurler) (born 1991), Irish hurler
 Patrick O'Connor (Australian politician) (1862–1923)
 Patrick O'Connor (Manitoba politician)
 Patrick O'Connor (bishop) (1848–1932), Irish-born Roman Catholic bishop of Armidale, New South Wales, Australia
 Patrick O'Connor (Massachusetts politician) (born 1984), American politician
 Patrick O'Connor (American football) (born 1993), American football defensive end
 Patrick O'Connor (painter) (1909–1997), American painter
 Patrick J. O'Connor (born 1955), Chicago city alderman
 Patrick John O'Connor (1924–1990), New Zealand wrestler
 Patrick O'Connor (judge) (1914–2001), British judge
 Patrick Edward O'Connor, Roman Catholic priest
 Patrick O'Connor, Irish immigrant hanged in Iowa, see Hanging of Patrick O'Connor
 Padraic Fiacc (Patrick Joseph O'Connor, 1924–2019), Irish poet
 Paddy O'Connor (1879–1950), baseball player
 pseudonym of the writer Leonard Wibberley (1915–1983)

See also
 Pat O'Connor (disambiguation)
 Patrick Connor (disambiguation)